Donovan is an unincorporated community in Johnson County, Georgia, United States.

Notes

Unincorporated communities in Johnson County, Georgia
Unincorporated communities in Georgia (U.S. state)